Niekie van de Berg is a South African politician, formerly a Member of Parliament with the Democratic Alliance. He served as the DA Shadow Minister of Arts and Culture from 2012 until 2014, when he was succeeded by Winston Rabotapi. He is a former talk radio presenter with Radio Sonder Grense.

Van den Berg announced his resignation from the Democratic Alliance in 2014 and joined the smaller Freedom Front Plus.

References

Offices held 

Living people
Democratic Alliance (South Africa) politicians
Freedom Front Plus politicians
Members of the National Assembly of South Africa
Year of birth missing (living people)